François Patrice (1 January 1924 – 19 December 2018) was a French film and television actor.

Selected filmography
 The Sea Rose (1946)
 Dilemma of Two Angels (1948)
 Three Boys, One Girl (1948)
 Duel in Dakar (1951)
 Rue des Saussaies (1951)
 The Big Flag (1954) 
 The Affair of the Poisons (1955)
 The Whole Town Accuses (1956)
 Tales of Paris (1962)
 Love in the Night (1968)

References

Bibliography
 Goble, Alan. The Complete Index to Literary Sources in Film. Walter de Gruyter, 1999.

External links

1924 births
2018 deaths
French male film actors
French male television actors
Male actors from Beirut
French expatriates in Lebanon